The Southwest LRT (Metro Green Line Extension) is an under–construction  light rail transit corridor in Hennepin County, Minnesota, with service between Minneapolis and Eden Prairie. The estimated one-way travel time from Southwest Station in Eden Prairie to Target Field Station in Minneapolis is 32 minutes. The Southwest LRT will extend through St. Louis Park, Hopkins and Minnetonka along the route. Major locations on the line will include Bde Maka Ska, Cedar Lake, the Walker Art Center, the Minneapolis Sculpture Garden and Target Field in downtown Minneapolis.

Hennepin County selected the alignment of the route and worked with the Metropolitan Council on environmental impact statements for the project. The Metropolitan Council is managing construction of the route. On November 15, 2018, the council accepted an $800 million construction bid by Lunda Construction and C.S. McCrossan, with early construction starting in December 2018. The project has had unexpected construction delays, especially at the site of a tunnel near the Kenilworth Trail corridor. The delays have increased the cost of the project to up to about $2.7 billion and pushed back the expected opening date from 2023 to 2027, resulting in criticism of the Metropolitan Council. The Southwest LRT is the most expensive public works project in Minnesota history.

Current route 
The line begins at the Southwest Transit Station in Eden Prairie, passing Eden Prairie's Town Center and crosses US 212 and I-494. It goes into the Golden Triangle, under MN 62, and into Opus. It crosses into Minnetonka on a bridge, and enters the railroad corridor. It turns east into Hopkins, and passes under US 169. It goes east, and has four more stations before entering Minneapolis. It turns north, and enters a tunnel. Upon exiting the tunnel, it has 3 stations, and passes under I-394 and I-94. It leaves the railroad, enters Royalston, and terminates at Target Field.

History
In 1988, the Hennepin County Regional Railroad Authority (HCRRA) identified the Southwest transitway from Hopkins to downtown Minneapolis as a future LRT corridor.

In 2002 and 2003, the HCRRA conducted the Southwest Rail Transit Study to evaluate twelve possible light rail routes in the southwest transitway. Of the twelve routes, eight were eliminated and four were selected for further analysis: routes 1A, 2A, 3A and 4A.

On March 4, 2009, the FTA approved a $2 million study of the project, with a then-anticipated opening date in 2015. On May 26, 2010, the Metropolitan Council voted to approve the locally preferred alternative advanced by Hennepin County. The project at that point transferred to Metropolitan Council control and at the time was expected to begin service in 2018. Since receiving approval from the Metropolitan Council on May 26, 2010, the Southwest LRT joins the Bottineau LRT as an official part of the Metro Council's project list. The Metropolitan Council began design work in 2013, after the completion of the draft Environmental Impact Statement.

Route debate

On May 26, 2010, the Metropolitan Council approved route 3A as the locally preferred alternative for the line. There was a protracted debate over the route choice in the years leading up to this decision, with many parties strongly opposed to the final route choice. The final choice in favor of 3A was made for several reasons, including its favorable Cost Effectiveness Index (CEI) score and its relatively lower environmental impacts.

Several possible routing variations were evaluated to determine the final routing of the line. There was local debate about the route the line would take between the Chain of Lakes and downtown Minneapolis. Routes 1A and 3A (chosen route) use the Kenilworth Corridor, a dedicated stretch of right-of-way owned by the HCRRA to be used for future rail transit. Route 3C would have the tracks run much further east through the trench used by the Midtown Greenway before turning north at Nicollet Avenue, where it would have run in a tunnel for part of the way downtown.

Kenilworth alignment (routes 1A, 3A-chosen route)
The Kenilworth Corridor was acquired by the HCRRA to preserve it for future rail transit. The Kenilworth routing would have provided shorter ride times for the majority of the line's users compared to the 3C routing. It is also less expensive to build and operate.

Supporters of a network alignment propose that a streetcar or trolley line be installed alongside the Midtown Greenway to connect the Southwest LRT line to the existing Blue Line; however, this will not occur. Rather LRT will be used for the full stretch of the line. The Midtown Greenway Coalition has long supported and promoted the network alignment. The group successfully prevented the trench from being used for a busway and instead pitched the idea of the trench being used for a potential streetcar line.

Some residents living adjacent to the Kenilworth Corridor favored the 3C route because they were concerned about the noise and disturbance of the trains passing through the corridor near their homes. The Kenilworth Corridor presently contains an active freight rail line and the light rail will be in addition to this existing track. Operating the two LRT tracks adjacent to the Twin Cities & Western Railroad line (four freight trains each day) will require Metro Transit to purchase a standard $300 Million insurance policy holding the railroad harmless for any accidents caused by derailments of freight or LRT trains. The annual premium cost of this policy is approximately $1.5 Million.

Greenway/Nicollet alignment (route 3C)
Advocates of the 3C route wanted the line to directly serve Uptown and Eat Street, and feel that routing the line through the Kenilworth Corridor would be a missed opportunity for increased ridership and better transit in this area of Minneapolis.

Some Eat Street business owners were concerned that the access and traffic problems resulting from the construction period on Nicollet Avenue would severely affect their business. Engineers indicated Nicollet Avenue may have been tunneled instead of at-grade.

In early 2008, Hennepin County Medical Center acquired a city block parcel at 28th Street and Nicollet where the 3C Route would turn from the Midtown Greenway trench onto or under Nicollet Avenue. HCMC is building a clinic on the site that does not incorporate a light rail station or easement into the building. That would have prevented the 3C route from turning at this location since there is not enough space for tracks to make the minimum required turning radius.

Neighborhood positions
During public input phases in 2007–2008 the final three proposed routes faced opposition by some members of two Minneapolis neighborhoods, Kenwood and Whittier. Kenwood's neighborhood organization released an official neighborhood stance against the line with Whittier's organization debating to release a stance. In Kenwood, one of the wealthiest neighborhoods, their criticism involves disruption to natural parkland and noise though the Kenilworth Corridor (which routes '1A' and '3A' would run on). The corridor is home to the Kenilworth Trail, a scenic bike and pedestrian trail that runs adjacent to a rarely used freight rail line. In Whittier, disruption to Nicollet Avenue by the '3C' route had brought concern to business owners regarding Eat Street as a business, restaurant and retail corridor of the Whittier neighborhood.

The Bryn Mawr neighborhood has favored the routes moving through the Kenilworth Corridor as it supports their redevelopment plans. Also, suburban cities have received the proposals favorably with concern over routing within their cities than opposition of the line itself. The 3A route through job centers in Eden Prairie garnered approval from its City Council. Hopkins also proposed routing the line through their downtown Main Street, but it will instead be routed nearby.

Funding and delays
In April 2015, the council released an updated analysis of the project, with projected costs raised by more than $300 million to $1.994 billion, largely as a result of additional sitework and ground preparation due to poor soil along the route. The expected opening date of the line was also pushed back to 2020, as a result of delays to the next draft of the Environmental Impact Statement, which was expected to be released in May 2015, more than a year after the original planned release in January 2014. To bring costs within the original budget, Metropolitan Council members proposed measures such as eliminating the Mitchell Road station in Eden Prairie or decreasing the size of the Hopkins maintenance facility.

A reduced $1.744 billion budget for the line was approved by the Metropolitan Council in July 2015. Changes from the original plan included the deletion of the Mitchell Road terminus, removal of planned station art, and the deferral of the Eden Prairie Town Center station.

On May 22, 2016, the Minnesota Legislature was unable to agree on whether or not to fund the State of Minnesota's 10% portion of the project.  On August 31, 2016, the State's 10% portion ($144.5 million) was funded by Certificates of Participation by three government bodies: the Metropolitan Council ($103.5 million),the Counties Transit Improvement Board ($20.5 million) and Hennepin County ($20.5 million) to close the $144.5 million gap.

In 2016, the Metropolitan Council reserved $118 million to Siemens to build a fleet of 27 vehicles for the Southwest LRT. An order for these 27 Siemens S700 vehicles was placed in October 2016, and the first two cars were received by Metro Transit in May 2020.

On February 15, 2017, the Metropolitan Council announced that the Southwest LRT design and engineering phase would be complete at the end of 2017. 
As of late February 2022 work at the Kenilworth tunnel had been stopped since January that year due to damage to a neighboring condominium. In mid-April 2022, after inspecting the damage to the condo, engineers cleared the tunnel work to resume. In March of 2023, however, condominum owners at the affected building reported that damange related to light rail construction was worsening, to which the Metropolitan Council replied that the condo owners association had not filed any claims related to new damage. 

In March 2023, the Minnesota Office of the Legislative Auditor reported that in planning construction for the Southwest LRT, the Metropolitan Council obligated funds that it did not have and failed to develop a contingency plan if the required project funding did not materialize. The Metropolitan Council had solicited bids for civil construction with project specifications it knew to be incomplete. After bidding was completed, the Metropolitan Council's addition of substantial new or changed work resulted in delays and increased costs. Legislative Auditor Judy Randall noted that the Metropolitan Council was less cooperative than most state agencies they audited, and criticized their lack of transparency in communicating problems related to the Southwest LRT to the public.

Construction
Construction bids were revealed publicly on August 15, 2017 but were rejected for being too costly and non-responsive (Bids did not meet the requirements). As of May 2018, the Met Council estimated the building costs to be at $2.003 billion. On November 15, 2018, the council accepted an $800 million construction bid for a section of the construction by Lunda Construction and C.S. McCrossan.

Construction of the line is the State of Minnesota's largest public works project currently underway, and is happening in all five cities that the line is served by. The project is known to disrupt major trails such as the Cedar Lake LRT Regional Trail, and the Kenilworth Trail. The line was expected to be completed in 2023, but unexpected poor soils in the Kenilworth Corridor have delayed the opening. In July 2021 the Metropolitan Council did not have a date when the line will be completed or how delays will affect project cost. In a private call with government stakeholders, the Metropolitan Council expected a delay of at least two years, pushing a late 2025 opening at the earliest. Construction contractors will use alternate construction methods for the portion with poor soils. In January 2022 Metropolitan Council officials changed the expected opening to 2027 with increased costs between $450 to $550 million expected.

Initial construction began in late 2018 with brush removal, and heavy construction of the line began in 2019. The project reached its  completion milestone in August 2020 and a  completion in July 2021. The first two of 27 Siemens S700 light rail vehicles ordered for the project were delivered to Metro Transit on May 21, 2020.

References

External links

 Southwest LRT Community Works
 Southwest light rail map
 Metropolitan Council project website
 Locally Preferred Alternative

Proposed railway lines in Minnesota
Light rail in Minnesota
Transportation in Minnesota
Transportation in Minneapolis
Tram and light rail transit systems under construction
2027 in rail transport
Metro Transit (Minnesota)